The Renewable Energy Directive 2018 (2018/2001) is a Directive in EU law that requires 32 percent of the energy consumed within the European Union to be renewable by 2030. This target is pooled among the member states.

Background
 
Before the 2009 version of the Directive, EU leaders had already reached agreement in March 2007 that, in principle, 20% of the bloc's final energy consumption should be produced from renewable energy sources by 2020 as part of its drive to cut carbon dioxide emissions. This policy later became part of the EU2020 Energy Strategy dated 10 November 2010. The key objectives of the strategy are to reduce carbon dioxide emissions by 20%, to increase the share of renewable energy to 20%, and to achieve energy savings of 20% or more.  The targets are mutually dependent.

The draft report on the directive was published by the European Commission in January 2008.  Claude Turmes served as rapporteur on the draft. Members states were obliged to notify the European Commission by 30 June 2010 of a National Renewable Energy Action Plan which sets out the road map of the trajectory.  Member states also have to submit progress reports explaining their implementation of the directive and their progress towards their targets, as is required by article22 of the directive.

A June 2015 report from the European Commission shows that EU countries are on track to meet the aggregate 20% goal.

The 2009 Directive was substantially changed and replaced through a 2018 recast, sometimes known as the "Renewable Energy Directive II", with the a new objective of a minimum of 32% renewable energy by 2030. The Fit for 55 package proposed by the European Commission in July 14 proposes further changes that significantly revise this recast version of the Directive, and is currently (June 2022) making its way through the legislative process.

Contents

2009 national targets for renewable energy
The overall EU target for renewable energy use is 20% by the year 2020. Targets for renewable energy in each country vary from a minimum of 10% in Malta to 72% of total energy use in Iceland.

2018 national targets for renewable energy

The overall EU target for renewable energy use is 32% by the year 2030.

In contrast to the 2020 renewable energy target, the 2030 renewable energy target is only binding at EU level and there are no binding targets for the individual Member States anymore.

See also 
EU law
 Directive 2001/77/EC – a superseded directive dating from 2001
 European Union directive
 List of European Union directives
 National Renewable Energy Action Plans
 EU energy efficiency directive
UK enterprise law

Notes

External links 
 Text of the directive
 EU National Renewable Energy Action Plans (NREAPS)
 National Energy Efficiency Plans and Annual Reports.
 Progress Reports

2009 in law
2020 in the European Union
Energy in Europe
European Union directives
Renewable energy policy